C/2007 Q3 (Siding Spring), is an Oort cloud comet that was discovered by Donna Burton in 2007 at Siding Spring Observatory in New South Wales, Australia. Siding Spring came within 1.2 astronomical units of Earth and 2.25 AU of the Sun on October 7, 2009. The comet was visible with binoculars until January 2010.

Images of the comet taken in March 2010 by N.Howes using the Faulkes telescope, showed that the nucleus had fragmented.

The comet has an observation arc of 1,327 days and was still being observed as of April 2011. The orbit of a long-period comet is properly obtained when the osculating orbit is computed at an epoch after leaving the planetary region and is calculated with respect to the center of mass of the solar system. Using JPL Horizons, the barycentric orbital elements for epoch 2030-Jan-01 generate a semi-major axis of 7,500 AU, an apoapsis distance of 15,000 AU, and a period of approximately 650,000 years.

Before entering the planetary region (epoch 1950), C/2007 Q3 had a calculated barycentric orbital period of ~6.4 million years with an apoapsis (aphelion) distance of about 69,000 AU (1.09 light-years). The comet was probably in the outer Oort cloud for millions or billions of years with a loosely bound chaotic orbit until it was perturbed inward.

References

External links 
 Orbital simulation from JPL (Java) / Horizons Ephemeris
 C/2007 Q3 ( Siding Spring ) - Seiichi Yoshida @ aerith.net (with pictures taken by different astronomers around the world)
 Curious coma-tail of C/2007 Q3 (Siding-Spring) (Remanzacco Observatory March 9, 2009)
 Splitting of C/2007 Q3 (Siding spring) nucleus (Leonid Elenin April 2, 2010)

Non-periodic comets
Hyperbolic comets
Oort cloud
Discoveries by SSS
20070825